Gekko palawanensis, also known as the Palawan gecko or the Palawan narrow-disked gecko, is a species of gecko. It is endemic to Palawan in the Philippines.

References

Gekko
Endemic fauna of the Philippines
Reptiles of the Philippines
Fauna of Palawan
Reptiles described in 1925
Taxa named by Edward Harrison Taylor